Mercha kefula (מֵרְכָא כּפוּלָ֦ה, with variant English spellings) is a rare cantillation mark that occurs 5 times in the Torah (once in Genesis, once in Exodus, once in Leviticus, and twice in Numbers) and once in the Haftarah (for Behaalotecha and for the intermediate Shabbat for Chanukah, in the Book of Zechariah.)

The Hebrew words מֵרְכָא כּפוּלָ֦ה translate into English as double mercha. This name is given since the mark that is used appears like two merchas.

Purpose

Dr. David Weisberg suggested that the merkha kefula mark is found on words that refer to an aggadic tale.

Occurrences
The Merkha kefula mark appears in the following locations in the Torah:

Total occurrences

The Merkha kefulah note occurs a total of 14 times according to the Leningrad Codex. They are: 
 לו 
 תעשה 
 לא 
 טוב 
 לה 
 לא 
 אלה 
 לו 
 ריב 
 זה 
 לא 
 לב 
 לא 
 לו

Melody

References

Cantillation marks